Wilfried Wöhler (born 9 February 1935) is a German fencer. He represented the United Team of Germany at the 1960 Summer Olympics in the individual and team sabre events.

References

1935 births
Living people
German male fencers
Olympic fencers of the United Team of Germany
Fencers at the 1960 Summer Olympics